The Battle of Marciano (also known as the Battle of Scannagallo) occurred in the countryside of Marciano della Chiana, near Arezzo, Tuscany, on August 2, 1554, during the Italian War of 1551. The battle marked the defeat of the Republic of Siena in its war against the Duchy of Florence, and resulted in Siena losing its independence and being absorbed into the Duchy of Florence.

Prelude 
In 1554, Cosimo I de' Medici, with the support of Emperor Charles V, launched a grand campaign to conquer Florence's last remaining rival in Tuscany, the Republic of Siena. His army was under the command of Gian Giacomo Medici, Marquess of Marignano, best known as "Medeghino" ("Small Medici"). The Florentine-Imperial troops were divided into three corps: Federico Barbolani di Montauto, with 800 men, landed in southern Tuscany to conquer the area of Grosseto; Rodolfo Baglioni, with 3,000 men, invaded the Val di Chiana to conquer Chiusi, Pienza, and Montalcino; and the main corps under Medeghino himself, consisting of 4,500 infantry, 20 cannons, and 1,200 sappers, was deployed at Poggibonsi for the main attack against Siena.

The Sienese entrusted the defence to Piero Strozzi, a fierce rival of the Medici family and a general in French service. French troops, as well as some Florentine exiled by the Medici, took part in the war under the Sienese aegis.

The Florentine troops approached Siena on the night of January 26, 1554. After an initial failed assault, the Marquess of Marignano laid siege to the city, although his men were not numerous enough to totally cut it off from the countryside. Both Baglioni and Montauto failed to capture Pienza and Grosseto. French ships harassed the Florentine resupply lines at Piombino. Cosimo replied to the initial setbacks by hiring Ascanio della Cornia with 6,000 infantry and 300 cavalry, and waiting for further Imperial reinforcements.

On June 11, Strozzi attempted a sally to relieve the pressure on Siena, leaving some French units in the city. He moved towards Pontedera, forcing Medeghino to raise the siege to follow him. This did not prevent Strozzi from joining with a French contingent with 3,500 infantry, 700 horse, and 4 cannons in the territory of Lucca. On June 21, Strozzi conquered Montecatini, but did not feel confident enough to join in a pitched battle against Medeghino, waiting instead for further French reinforcements which were to arrive at Viareggio. He had, in total, 9,500 infantry and perhaps 1,200 cavalry, while Medici had 2,000 Spanish, 3,000 German, and 6,000 Italian infantry, as well as 600 cavalry, not to mention further troops from Spain and Corsica which had recently landed at Bocca d'Arno. His brother, Leone Strozzi, had been killed by an arquebus ball in the course of the struggle for Grosseto.

Strozzi therefore marched back to Siena, where the supply situation had become desperate. In July, he failed to capture Piombino, in southern Tuscany, the only port from which the French supplies could reach Siena. On July 17, conscious that only a victory in a pitched battle could save the city, he tried a third sally in the Val di Chiana, in the direction of Arezzo, leaving 1,000 infantry and 200 cavalry as a garrison under Blaise de Montluc. His field army included 14,000 infantry, about 1,000 cavalry, and five guns.

His force easily overwhelmed the small Florentine garrisons on his way, although the attempt, on July 20, to conquer Arezzo failed. He managed to capture Lucignano, Marciano della Chiana, Foiano, and other centres in the following days.

After some days of inactivity, Medeghino raised the siege of Siena and moved to meet Strozzi.

Battle

After some initial skirmishes, the two large armies clashed when Strozzi, short of food, decided to retire towards Lucignano in the night of August 1. In the morning of the following day, it was clear that his manoeuver had not been successful, and he was forced to lay battle against the Florentine-Imperial troops that were stalking and harassing his moving troops.

The Sienese had: c. 1,000 French-Sienese horse on the right wing; then followed, in the centre, 3,000 Landsknechts, with 3,000 Grisons infantry behind them and another 3,000 French infantry on their left; the left wing was formed by 5,000 Italian infantry under Paolo Orsini. Strozzi's army occupied the slight slope of a hill that descended towards the Scannagallo creek. Il Medeghino deployed 1,200 light cavalry on his left wing, backed by 300 Uomini-d'Arme (heavy cavalry) under Marcantonio Colonna. The centre infantry corps was composed by 2,000 Spanish veterans and other Corsican recruits and 4,000 German Landsknechts under Niccolò Madruzzo. The right wing was formed by 4,000 Tuscan, 2,000 Spanish and 3,000 poorly trained Roman infantry, in three rows, with the few artillery pieces available behind. The reserve included 200 Spanish soldiers, veterans of the Ottoman–Habsburg wars, and a company of horse arquebusiers from Naples.

The battle began with the attack of the Medeghino's cavalry wing, whose impetus easily routed its French-Sienese counterpart, which fled towards Foiano. It has been reported that the French commanders of that unit, Valleron and Fourquevaux, had been bribed by the Medeghino with 12 tin flasks filled with golden coins.

To counter this first setback, Strozzi decided to launch down from the hill with the German infantry in his center. A chaotic melee ensued but soon the momentum of the Sienese attack began to wane under the fire of the Imperial artillery which also disorganized the Swiss attempting to relieve the first line. When Il Medeghino then ordered his men to launch themselves against the enemy the German and Swiss began to panic. This turned into a rout when Colonna's heavy cavalry, who had pursued for a while the French-Sienese cavalry, attacked the Germans, fighting across the Scannagallo, from behind. The French infantry on the right wing maintained its battle order and, surrounded on every side, defended desperately until the end.

Strozzi himself was wounded three times and was carried away by his guards. His lieutenant Clemente della Cervara died shortly after the battle from wounds received.

The battle lasted for only two hours, from 11 a.m to 1 p.m. The Sienese army suffered 4,000 dead and 4,000 wounded or prisoners. Strozzi escaped capture.

Aftermath
Il Medeghino easily subdued the neighbouring castles in the days following the battle, and was subsequently able to lay a tighter siege to Siena. Cruel measures were adopted to prevent the peasants taking supplies into the city. In March 1555 he destroyed a corps of 1,300 mercenaries trying to escape to collect food.

Unable to receive substantial supplies and reinforcements from the French, the city surrendered on April 17, 1555 while the remaining Sienese forces withdrew to Montalcino.

The Republic of Siena finally disappeared in 1559 and was thenceforth incorporated into the Duchy of Florence. The Duke ordered that a large fortress be constructed as a precaution against the risk of further rebellion by the Sienese, and this has presided over the city, from its north (Florentine) side, since its completion in 1563.

Notes

References

External links
Battle website 
Page about il Medeghino 

1554 in Italy
Marciano 1544
Marciano 1544
Marciano 1554
Conflicts in 1554
Italian War of 1551–1559